Joseph Saliste (born 10 April 1995) is an Estonian professional footballer who plays as a left back for Estonian club Paide Linnameeskond.

Career
On 20 February 2019, Saliste was loaned out to JK Trans Narva for one year.

International career
Saliste made his senior international debut for Estonia on 19 November 2017, replacing Trevor Elhi in the second half of a 2–0 away victory over Fiji in a friendly.

Honours

Club
Flora
Meistriliiga: 2015, 2017
Estonian Cup: 2015–16
Estonian Supercup: 2016

References

External links

1995 births
Living people
Footballers from Tallinn
Estonian footballers
Association football defenders
Esiliiga players
FC Warrior Valga players
Meistriliiga players
FC Flora players
JK Narva Trans players
Estonia youth international footballers
Estonia under-21 international footballers
Estonia international footballers